Leong Cheok Keng is a Malaysian politician who has served as Member of the Perak State Legislative Assembly for Malim Nawar from May 2013 until November 2022.  Currently he is a member of WARISAN, which he joined on 3 November 2022. He was a member of the Democratic Action Party (DAP), a component party of the  formerly Pakatan Rakyat (PR) and presently Pakatan Harapan (PH) opposition coalitions. He was also, for a brief period, a member of the Parti Bangsa Malaysia (PBM), a party aligned with the ruling Barisan Nasional (BN) coalition.

Politics 
He was expelled from DAP on 19 January 2021 for applying to join MCA. However, he stayed as independent and did not join any party. On 14 January 2022, he had announced that he had joined PBM. On 3 November 2022, he had announced that he had quitted PBM and will participate in the 2022 Perak state election under WARISAN. In the election, Leong lost his state seat to Pakatan Harapan candidate V Bavani @ Shasha, garnering only 684 votes and lost his deposit.

Personal life 
His younger brother, Leong Cheok Lung is also a politician and has participated in the 2022 Malaysian general election, contesting in the Kampar federal seat under WARISAN.

Election result

External links

References 

Democratic Action Party (Malaysia) politicians
Members of the Perak State Legislative Assembly
Malaysian people of Chinese descent
Malaysian politicians of Chinese descent
Living people
Year of birth missing (living people)